Cellulomonas bogoriensis is a Gram-positive, chemoorganotrophic, alkaliphilic, slightly halotolerant and rod-shaped bacterium from the genus Cellulomonas which has been isolated from sediments and water from the littoral zone of the Lake Bogoria in Kenya.

References

 

Micrococcales
Bacteria described in 2005